Bobby Reynolds was the defender of championship title; however, he lost to Ryan Sweeting in the first round.
John Isner won in the final 7–5, 6–4, against Donald Young.

Seeds

Draw

Final four

Top half

Bottom half

References
Main Draw
Qualifying Draw

2009 ATP Challenger Tour
2009 Singles
2009 in sports in Florida